Viji was an Indian actress, who appeared in Tamil films. She made her debut in Kozhi Koovuthu and acted in over 40 films.

Biography
Viji made her debut in Gangai Amaren's Kozhi Koovuthu. It went on to become a super hit and she was often referred to as 'Kozhi Koovuthu' Viji after the film.

During shooting for a song sequence in the Vijay-starrer Poove Unakkaga, Viji experienced hip and back pain and she underwent an operation on her spinal cord in 1996 at the Chennai Apollo Hospitals. The operation failed and doctors found an acute infection in the wound caused by the surgery. After more surgeries, Viji suffered temporary paralysis. She filed a lawsuit on Apollo Hospitals which returned Rs 30,000. Viji recovered after a corrective surgery and made a comeback to films in 2000 with Simmasanam. Vijayakanth, who had acted with Viji in many films, gave her an opportunity to star in the film and had promised to give her a role in his next film Vaanchinathan also, but Simmasanam ultimately remained her last film.

On 27 November 2000, Viji committed suicide in her home in Chennai. Her suicide note blamed a failed love affair with director A R Ramesh, who was already married. The Hindu reported that the prosecution case was that Ramesh promised to marry her but declined later and that three days prior to her death, Ramesh met Viji at a function and abused her. Ramesh, his wife, A R Sumathi, and his friend Chinnasamy were charged with "abetting the suicide" of Viji and acquitted by the Mahila Court.

Filmography

References

External links
 
 Viji at Cinesouth

Actresses from Chennai
Indian film actresses
Actresses in Tamil cinema
2000 deaths
1966 births
Actresses in Malayalam cinema
20th-century Indian actresses
21st-century Indian actresses
2000 suicides
Suicides in India